This is a list of hyms authored by Dun Karm Psaila.

Eucharistic Hymn (T’Adoriam Ostia Divina) 

Among the many religious hymns written by Dun Karm, one that became popular even abroad was "T'adoriam ostia divina" or "Nadurawk ja Ħobż tas-Sema".  When the International Eucharistic Congress was held in Malta in 1913, Maestro Joseph Caruana asked Dun Karm to write a hymn for the occasion. Many of the bishops present at the Congress loved the hymn, took it with them to their respective dioceses and had it translated. It has since become popular in many languages, for example, in English with the title "Host Divine, we bow in Worship" and in Spanish "Te adoramos, Hostia Divina". Dun Karm himself provided a Maltese version in 1924.

Maltese National Anthem (L-Innu Malti) 
In 1922, Professor Mro. Robert Samut composed a short melody, which was obtained a year later by Dr A.V. Laferla, Director of Primary Schools in Malta, who wanted to have an anthem composed which could be sung by students in Malta's schools as an expression of their Maltese identity. Laferla asked Dun Karm to write lyrics to fit the melody, which then became the Maltese National Anthem.

Morning and Evening Hymns 
These hymns are frequently used in many parishes during morning and evening masses, and are used for solemnities in the Maltese translation of the Liturgy of the Hours.

A Marian Hymn (Fil-Ħlewwa ta' Mejju)

Hymn to the Sacred Heart (Tina l-Ħlewwa)

References

Christian hymns
Maltese literature
Hymns by author
Latin religious words and phrases